Randal Alan Falker (born July 22, 1985) is an American professional basketball player for CSU Sibiu of the Romanian League. He is a 2.01 m (6'7") 115 kg (254 lb.) power forward-center.

High school career
Falker played high school basketball at Gateway. He was rated by Scout.com as a two-star prospect, the No. 3 power forward in the state of Missouri, and the No. 85 overall prospect nationally, in the class of 2003.

College career
Falker played 3 seasons (2004–2007) in the NCAA college basketball championship, playing for Southern Illinois University's Salukis under coach Chris Lowery. As a sophomore Falker's explosive rebounding and shot-blocking won him MVP honors at the Missouri Valley Conference. As a junior, the 6-foot-7-inch forward averaged 12.3 points and 7.7 rebounds per game for the Salukis. Falker led the league in blocked shots and helped SIU advance to the Sweet 16 round of the NCAA basketball tournament.

Professional career
After not being drafted at the NBA's 2008 NBA draft, Falker decided to start his pro career in Europe, and signed in the summer of 2008 with Cholet Basket (French Pro A League), where he became a major player of the team, under head coach Erman Kunter, and one of the best rebounders of the league. With Cholet, he also played in European-wide competitions, such as the EuroChallenge 2008–09 season, where his team reached the Final game, the EuroCup 2009–10 season, and the EuroLeague 2010–11 season. In 2010, he won the French Pro A League championship with Cholet.

On September 26, 2012, Falker signed with Beşiktaş of the Turkish Basketball Super League, for the 2012–13 season.

On July 3, 2013, Falker signed a one-year contract with SLUC Nancy Basket of France. In February 2014, he extended his contract until 2016. At the end of the 2013–14 LNB Pro A season, he was named the league's best foreign player of the season.

On October 10, 2016, Falker signed with Greek club AEK Athens. On January 29, 2017, Falker signed with Steaua București of the Liga Națională. On August 13, 2018, Falker joined CSU Sibiu of the Romanian League.

References

External links
 Euroleague.net Profile
 Eurobasket.com Profile
 Greek Basket League Profile
 LNB.fr Profile 
 Mackolik.com Profile 

1985 births
Living people
AEK B.C. players
American expatriate basketball people in France
American expatriate basketball people in Greece
American expatriate basketball people in Romania
American expatriate basketball people in Turkey
American men's basketball players
Basketball players from St. Louis
Beşiktaş men's basketball players
Centers (basketball)
Cholet Basket players
CSU Sibiu players
Power forwards (basketball)
SLUC Nancy Basket players
Southern Illinois Salukis men's basketball players